Yago González López (born 6 November 1979) is a Spanish footballer who plays as for CD Pontellas as a forward.

He appeared in 241 games in Segunda División B over the course of eight seasons (59 goals scored), and played professionally in Hong Kong.

Club career

Spain
Born in Vigo, Galicia, González never played in higher than the third division in his country, being a youth product at local Celta de Vigo. He started his senior career with its B-team in 1998, competing in the fourth level.

During a 13-and-a-half-season spell, González played with Águilas CF, Levante UD B, Terrassa FC, Pontevedra CF (two spells), Zamora CF and CD Lugo, appearing in division three with all the clubs and in the fourth tier with the second and the fourth.

Kitchee
In January 2012, aged nearly 33, González signed with Kitchee SC from the Hong Kong First Division League. He made an impressive debut for his new club – also his first match as a professional – by scoring the winning goal and providing an assist in a league game against Sun Hei SC which finished with a 2–1 win, and went on to net a further five times in eight appearances as the campaign ended with the conquest of an historic treble.

In his second year, González only managed four goals in the league, but added three in four contests in the season's FA Cup as Kitchee renewed its supremacy in the latter competition.

Southern District
On 29 May 2013, González joined fellow league side Southern District RSA on a free transfer. He scored on his first appearance, a 2–3 away league loss against South China AA, adding a hat-trick at Sun Hei on 11 May 2014 to contribute decisively to a 3–2 win.

Hong Kong Rangers
On 31 May 2014, Yago signed for Hong Kong Rangers FC.

Club statistics

Honours
Kitchee
Hong Kong First Division League: 2011–12
Hong Kong FA Cup: 2011–12, 2012–13
Hong Kong League Cup: 2011–12

References

External links

1979 births
Living people
Spanish footballers
Footballers from Vigo
Association football forwards
Segunda División B players
Tercera División players
Celta de Vigo B players
Atlético Levante UD players
Terrassa FC footballers
Pontevedra CF footballers
Zamora CF footballers
CD Lugo players
Hong Kong First Division League players
Kitchee SC players
Southern District FC players
Hong Kong Rangers FC players
Spanish expatriate footballers
Expatriate footballers in Hong Kong
Spanish expatriate sportspeople in Hong Kong
Hong Kong League XI representative players